Mike Schuppan is an American producer, mixing engineer and recording engineer.  He is known for his work with Paramore, M83, Jimmy Eat World and others. He has been the long time engineer for Justin Meldal-Johnsen and served as his bass tech while touring with  Nine Inch Nails and Beck. Mike has a private studio in Hollywood, California.

Discography
2009 Division Day - Visitation
2011 M83 - Hurry Up, We're Dreaming
2012 Neon Trees - Picture Show
2013 Crystal Fighters - Cave Rave
2013 Tegan and Sara - Heartthrob
2013 Paramore - Paramore
2014 Young The Giant - Mind Over Matter
2014 White Sea - In Cold Blood
2014 Frith - Imaginary World
2015 Yacht - I Thought The Future Would Be Cooler
2016 M83  - Junk
2016 Jimmy Eat World - Integrity Blues
2016 School of Seven Bells - SVIIB
2016 Dream Theater - The Astonishing
2016 Ziggy Marley - Ziggy Marley
2017 BNQT - Volume 1
2017 Wolf Alice - Visions Of A Life
2017 Foster The People - Sacred Hearts Club
2017 Paramore - After Laughter
2017 Bob Marley & The Wailers - Exodus 40
2018 Ziggy Marley - Rebellion Rises
2018 Preoccupations - New Material
2018 Metric - Art of Doubt
2018 Jimmy Eat World - Love Never/Half Heart
2018 Fiona Grey - Cult Classic
2018 Girls Of The Sun
2018 The Human Project
2018 The Human Element
2019 M83 - DSVII
2019 Private Island - 5xx
2019 Jimmy Eat World - Surviving
2019 Liza Anne - Devotion
2020 LÜT - Mersmak
2020 Liza Anne - Desire
2020 Lady Gaga - Chromatica

References

External links
 

American audio engineers
1983 births
Living people